In molecular biology, the glucose-methanol-choline oxidoreductase family (GMC oxidoreductase) is a family of enzymes with oxidoreductase activity.

The glucose-methanol-choline (GMC) oxidoreductases are FAD flavoproteins oxidoreductases. These enzymes include a variety of proteins; choline dehydrogenase (CHD) , methanol oxidase (MOX)  and cellobiose dehydrogenase  which share a number of regions of sequence similarities. They contain two conserved protein domains. The N-terminal domain corresponds to the FAD ADP-binding domain, the C-terminal domain is a steroid-binding domain.

References

Protein domains